Vinzons, officially the Municipality of Vinzons, is a 3rd class municipality in the province of Camarines Norte, Philippines. According to the 2020 census, it has a population of 43,485 people.

The Calaguas Islands is under the jurisdiction of Vinzons.

The first recorded name of Vinzons was Tacboan and was later changed to Indan at which time the Mayor was Pedro Barbin. The town was then renamed "Vinzons" in honor of Wenceslao Q. Vinzons, then Governor of the province. He was the youngest delegate to the 1934 Philippine Constitutional Convention and a guerrilla leader martyred by the Japanese during World War II.

History

The town was established in 1581 by the Franciscan priests without a patron saint and without a church. In 1611, Fr. Juan de Losar, OFM built a church named after Saint Peter.  Fr. Losar was the first Parish Priest of the church.  In 1624, the whole town of Tacboan was relocated and it was called Indan where a new church was built with the same Patron Saint, St. Peter the Apostle.

Vinzons has contributed priests and nuns to the Catholic Church more than any other town in the province. The town has also had more provincial elective officials than in any other town in the province. There was a time when all three candidates for governor hailed from Vinzons as when Dominador Asis, Fernando V. Pajarillo, and Wenceslao G. Vinzons, Jr. ran for governor in the elections of 1964. Before that, majority of the provincial governors came from Vinzons: Carlos Balce (1928-1931) Wenceslao Q. Vinzons (1937-1940), Carlos Ascutia (1944-1946), Regino Z. Guinto (1946-1947), Cayetano Vinzons (1958), Dominador Asis (1959-1963), Wenceslao G. Vinzons, Jr. (1964-1968), Fernando V. Pajarillo (who died while in office).

Only one mayor, Jose Tacalan "Buding" Segundo, has accomplished to finish the three (3) terms. He was the only municipal mayor in this town who is from a rural barangay, which is Barangay Sabang. Another prominent mayor who served for two terms is Cesar Asis Cereno, who pushed for massive agricultural development in the countryside, particularly seaweeds production, which improved the living conditions of constituents in most fishing villages and island barangays. Agnes Mago Diezmo Ang (2010-2016) is the first lady mayor in the municipality.

Geography

Barangays
Vinzons is politically subdivided into 19 barangays, listed here with their current Barangay Captains.

Climate

Demographics

Religion

Roman Catholic Churches 
St. Peter the Apostle Church - Fire destroyed the St. Peter the Apostle Church on 26 December 2012 at around 0130 hours which started from the old convent. The 400-year-old church was one of the oldest churches in Bicol and erected during the Spanish Colony in 1600.
St. Paul The Apostle Quasi Parish in Sabang
Our Lady of Peace & Good Voyage Parish in Calaguas
Our Lady of Fatima Shrine in Mangcauayan
Santo Domingo in Santo Domingo
St. Augustine in Matango

Economy

Government
Municipal officials:
 Municipal Mayor: Dr. Eleanor Ferrer Segundo
 Vice Mayor: Joaquin Emmanuel G. Pimentel
 Councilors:
Ligaya Heraldo
Augorio Guinto
Edwin Pajarillo
Alexander Bardon
Manuel Obusan
Erddie Valeros
Nestor Pajarillo 
Gilbert Adorino 
 Ex Officio (Liga ng mga Barangay): Jose T. Segundo
Ex Officio (SK Federation): Laiza Paulete

Education

Public secondary schools 
Vinzons Pilot High School (Main Campus)
DQ Liwag National High School
Matango National High School 
Sabang National High School 
E Quintela High School
Sarah Jane Ferrer High School

Public elementary schools 
 Don Miguel Lukban Elementary School
Vinzons Pilot Elementary School (Main Campus)
Mangcayo Elementary School
Calangacawan Norte Elementary School
Calangacawan Sur Elementary School
P.Barbin Elementary School
Guinacutan Elementary School
Banocboc Elementary School
Juanita Balon Elementary School
Santo Domingo Elementary School
M. Guinto Elementary School
Pinagtigasan Elementary School
Magcawayan Island Elementary School
Aguit-it Elementary School
Sula Elementary School
Sabang Elementary School
Matango Elementary School

Private elementary schools 
St Peter Kiddie School, Inc.
Vinzons Christian School

Private senior high school and higher educational institutions 
St. Francis Caracciolo Culinary Academy - Santo Domingo

Sectarian seminary 
Adorno Fathers Seminary

Gallery

Language
List of renamed cities and municipalities in the Philippines

References

External links

 [ Philippine Standard Geographic Code]
Philippine Census Information

Municipalities of Camarines Norte
Populated places established in 1581
1581 establishments in the Philippines